The UK Singles Chart is one of many music charts compiled by the Official Charts Company that calculates the best-selling singles of the week in the United Kingdom. Before 2004, the chart was only based on the sales of physical singles. This list shows singles that peaked in the Top 10 of the UK Singles Chart during 1998, as well as singles which peaked in 1997 and 1999 but were in the top 10 in 1998. The entry date is when the song appeared in the top 10 for the first time (week ending, as published by the Official Charts Company, which is six days after the chart is announced).

One-hundred and ninety-six singles were in the top ten in 1998. Ten singles from 1997 remained in the top 10 for several weeks at the beginning of the year, while "Chocolate Salty Balls (P.S. I Love You)" by Chef and Heartbeat"/"Tragedy" by Steps were both released in 1998 but did not reach their peak until 1999. "Angels" by Robbie Williams and "Never Ever" by All Saints were the singles from 1997 to reach their peak in 1998. Forty-nine artists scored multiple entries in the top 10 in 1998. Steps, B*Witched, Usher, Destiny's Child, Fatboy Slim, The Corrs, Shania Twain, Missy Elliott and Stereophonics were among the many artists who achieved their first UK charting top 10 single in 1998.

The 1997 Christmas number-one, "Too Much" by Spice Girls, remained at number-one for the first week of 1998. Charity single "Perfect Day" by Various Artists returned to the top spot for an additional week. The first new number-one single of the year was "Never Ever" by All Saints. Overall, thirty-two different singles peaked at number-one in 1998, with All Saints, B*Witched, Boyzone (including the "Perfect Day" charity single) and Mel B (3) having the joint most singles hit that position.

Background

Multiple entries
One-hundred and ninety-four singles charted in the top 10 in 1998, with one-hundred and eighty-seven singles reaching their peak this year (including the re-entries "Sit Down" and "You're the One That I Want" which charted in previous years but reached peaks on their latest chart run).

Forty-nine artists scored multiple entries in the top 10 in 1998. Two members of Spice Girls - Mel B and Melanie C - shared the record for the most top-ten singles in 1998 with six entries. Five of these singles were with the band, but they also had individual collaborations outside of the band. Mel B reached number one in September with "I Want You Back", which featured American rapper Missy "Missdemeanor" Elliott. Melanie C collaborated with Canadian rock artist Bryan Adams on "When You're Gone", the song peaking at number 3 in December. Three of Spice Girls top ten entries reached number-one: "Too Much" in December 1997, "Viva Forever" in July and "Goodbye" in December 1998. "Stop" peaked at number 2 in March, and they also featured on the England United collective single "(How Does It Feel to Be) On Top of the World" for the FIFA World Cup, which reached number 9.

Seven acts had four singles in the top 10: All Saints, Aqua, Boyzone, Five, Madonna, Robbie Williams and Steps.

Billie was one of a number of artists with three top 10 entries, including the number-one single "Because We Want To". Another Level, Celine Dion, Natalie Imbruglia, Sash! and Will Smith were among the other artists who had multiple top 10 entries in 1998.

Chart debuts
Eighty-one artists achieved their first top 10 single in 1998, either as a lead or featured artist. Of these, eleven went on to record another hit single that year: Brandy, Catatonia, Eagle-Eye Cherry, Fatboy Slim, Honeyz, Monica, Mýa, Savage Garden, Shania Twain, The Tamperer featuring Maya and Wyclef Jean. Another Level, B*Witched, Cerys Matthews, Cleopatra, The Corrs, Pras Michel and Steps all had two other entries in their breakthrough year.

The following table (collapsed on desktop site) does not include acts who had previously charted as part of a group and secured their first top 10 solo single.

Notes
Ian Brown of The Stone Roses launched a solo career in 1998, reaching number 5 in January with his debut single "My Star". Inaya Day was a featured vocalist on "Horny '98" by Mousse T. vs. Hot 'n' Juicy but is not credited on the Official Charts Company listing. She would have her first official entry in 2006 with "Nasty Girl", reaching number 9. Fat Les was made up of Blur bassist Alex James (who had secured ten top 10 singles up to that point, including number-ones "Beetlebum" and "Country House"), artist Damien Hirst making his chart debut, and Keith Allen, also in the charts for the first time as a singer but he had written "New Order's 1990 single "World in Motion".

Fatboy Slim was responsible for the "Renegade Master '98" remix by Wildchild at the start of the year but he did not make his official top 10 debut until June with "The Rockafeller Skank". Under his real name Norman Cook, he was also part of the line-up of Freak Power, who debuted with 1995's reissue of "Turn On, Tune In, Cop Out". Jimmy Page was a founding member of Led Zeppelin and in 1998 he collaborated with Puff Daddy on his song "Come with Me" which sampled the Zeppelin song "Kashmir". Mel B of Spice Girls had her first solo single alongside "Missy Elliott, reaching the top of the charts with "I Want You Back". Bandmate Melanie C made number 3 with her feature on the Bryan Adams song "When You're Gone".

East 17 returned in 1998 after splitting up in 1997 under the name E-17, which they kept until the following year before breaking up again. Their only top 10 single under this name was the number 2 single "Each Time". Chef is a character from the television series South Park voiced by Isaac Hayes. He had recorded two top 10 singles under his own name - "Theme from Shaft" and "Disco Connection".

Songs from films
Original songs from various films entered the top 10 throughout the year. These included "My Heart Will Go On" (from Titanic), "Truly Madly Deeply" (Music from Another Room), "Turn Back Time" (Sliding Doors), "Ghetto Supastar (That Is What You Are)" (Bulworth), "Deeper Underground" and "Come with Me" (Godzilla), "You're the One That I Want" (Grease), "Kiss the Girl" (The Little Mermaid), "Lost in Space" (Lost in Space), "I Don't Want to Miss a Thing" (Armageddon), "How Deep Is Your Love" (Rush Hour), "Another One Bites the Dust" (Small Soldiers), "Take Me There" (The Rugrats Movie) and "When You Believe" (The Prince of Egypt).  "Antmusic" was recorded for the movie A Bug's Life but was not used in the finished film.

Best-selling singles
Cher had the best-selling single of the year with "Believe". The song spent twelve weeks in the top 10 (including seven weeks at number one), sold over 1.519 million copies and was certified by the BPI. "My Heart Will Go On" by Celine Dion came in second place, selling more than 1.302 million copies and losing out by around 217,000 sales. Run-D.M.C. vs. Jason Nevins' "It's Like That", "No Matter What" from Boyzone and "C'est la Vie" by B*Witched made up the top five. Singles by LeAnn Rimes, Chef, Spice Girls, Pras Michel featuring ODB & Mýa and Savage Garden were also in the top ten best-selling singles of the year.

"Believe" (5) also ranked in the top 10 best-selling singles of the decade.

Top-ten singles

Entries by artist

The following table shows artists who achieved two or more top 10 entries in 1998, including singles that reached their peak in 1997 or 1999. The figures include both main artists and featured artists, while appearances on ensemble charity records are also counted for each artist.

Notes

 "Heartbeat"/"Tragedy" reached its peak of number-one on 9 January 1999.
 "Chocolate Salty Balls (P.S. I Love You)" reached its peak of number-one on 2 January 1999.
 "Something About the Way You Look Tonight"/"Candle in the Wind 1997" re-entered the top 10 at number 10 on 6 December 1997 (week ending), at number 10 on 20 December 1997 (week ending) and at number 10 on 3 January 1998 (week ending).
 Released as the official single for Children in Need in 1997.
 The original version of "Renegade Master" peaked outside the top 10 at number 11 upon its release in 1995. The remix by Fatboy Slim, entitled "Renegade Master '98", was released less than three years after Roger McKenzie (Wildchild)'s death.
 "Brimful of Asha" originally peaked outside the top 10 at number 60 upon its initial release in 1997. After a remixed version by Norman Cook became a radio and critical success, the song was re-released and reached number one in February 1998.
 "How Do I Live" re-entered the top 10 at number 9 on 11 April 1998 (week ending) for 3 weeks and at number 9 on 30 May 1998 (week ending) for 2 weeks. 
 "The Boy Is Mine" re-entered the top 10 at number 9 on 11 July 1998 (week ending) for 2 weeks. 
 England United was a supergroup consisting of Echo and the Bunnymen, Space, Spice Girls and Ocean Colour Scene.
 "You're the One That I Want" originally peaked at number-one for 9 weeks upon its initial release in 1978. The song was re-released in 1998 to mark the 20th anniversary of Grease.
 "To the Moon and Back" originally peaked outside the top 10 at number 55 upon its initial release in 1997.
 East 17 were known as E-17 from 1998 until 1999.
 The original version of "Sit Down" peaked at number 77 upon its release in 1989. A re-recorded version was released in 1991 and peaked at number 2. The 1998 remix of "Sit Down" was remixed by Apollo 440.
 "Miami" re-entered the top 10 at number 9 on 2 January 1999 (week ending) for 2 weeks.
 Denise van Outen, Johnny Vaughan and Steps covered Kylie Minogue and Jason Donovan's hit "Especially for You" as the official Children in Need single for 1998.
 Released as the official single for Children in Need.
 Figure includes song that peaked in 1997.
 Figure includes four top 10 hits with the group Spice Girls.
 Figure includes an appearance on 'England United' World Cup single "(How Does It Feel to Be) on Top of the World?".
 Figure includes appearance on Bryan Adams' "When You're Gone".
 Figure includes song that first charted in 1997 but peaked in 1998.
 Figure includes an appearance on the "Perfect Day" charity single.
 Figure includes song that peaked in 1999.
 Figure includes appearance on Denise and Johnny's "Especially for You".
 Figure includes two top 10 hits with the group Catatonia.
 Figure includes appearance on Queen and Wyclef Jean's "Another One Bites the Dust".
 Figure includes a top 10 hit with the group U2.
 Figure includes a top 10 hit with the group M People.
 Figures includes a top 10 hit with the group The Lightning Seeds.
 Figure includes appearance on Blackstreet and Mýa's "Take Me There".
 Figure includes appearance on Brandy's "Top of the World".
 Figure includes appearance on Pras Michel's "Ghetto Supastar (That Is What You Are)".
 Figure includes appearance on Sparkle's "Be Careful".
Careful".
 “(How Does It Feel to Be) On Top of the World” was released as the official single supporting England's participation in the 1998 FIFA World Cup.

See also
1998 in British music
List of number-one singles from the 1990s (UK)

References
General

Specific

External links
1998 singles chart archive at the Official Charts Company (click on relevant week)
Official Top 40 best-selling songs of 1998 at the Official Charts Company

United Kingdom
Top 10 singles
1998